The morphology of the Polish language is characterised by a fairly regular system of inflection (conjugation and declension) as well as word formation. Certain regular or common alternations apply across the Polish morphological system, affecting word formation and inflection of various parts of speech. These are described below, mostly with reference to the orthographic rather than the phonological system for clarity.

Morphophonologic alternations
Consonants in clusters and at the end of words are affected by the voicing rules; these are generally not reflected in the spelling. For example, the d in sąd ("court") is pronounced , while in inflected forms such as the plural sądy it is pronounced .
The vowels i and y have restricted distribution: i does not occur (except in some words of foreign origin) after c, cz, d, dz, dż, ł, r, sz, t, ż/rz, while y does not occur after k, g, l and palatal consonants. This means that in certain inflectional forms i appears in place of the expected y or vice versa (for example, the genitive of mąka "flour" is mąki, not *mąky).
The declension endings starting with the vowel e or i (except for the instrumental singular -em) have the effect of palatalizing the preceding consonant. Due to historical developments, the actual effect is dependent on the consonant.
  don't change 
i changes to y after 
 adjectival stem that ends in sz ż + masculine personal plural -i > si zi (e.g. )
  >  (e.g. )
  >  (e.g. )
  >  (e.g. )
  >  (e.g. )
  >  (e.g. )
  >  (e.g. )
  >  (e.g. )
  >  (e.g. )
  >  (e.g. )
  >  (e.g. )
  >  (spelled rz; e.g. )
  > 
 a noun ending in k + -em > kiem
 a noun ending in k + plural i > ki or cy
  > 
 a noun ending in g + -em > 
 a noun ending in g + plural i > gi or dzy
  > 
 a noun ending in ch + plural i > si or chy
Some words are subject to certain vowel alternations, caused by historical sound changes in Polish. The alternations are as follows (they do not apply to all words containing these vowels):
Alternations that depend on whether the syllable is closed or open:
ó–o (e.g. rób – robić)
ą–ę (e.g. dąb – dęby)
 (occasionally )-∅ (e.g. ,)
Alternations that take effect when the following consonant is modified by a palatalizing ending
 a–e (e.g. wiara – wierze)
 o (or ó)–e (e.g. )

Nouns

Declensions are generally divided into hard and soft declensions. Soft declensions are used when the stem of the noun ends in a soft (postalveolar or palatal-like) consonant in all forms, while hard declensions are used by nouns with stems ending in a hard consonant in some (but not necessarily all) forms.

Some nouns follow the adjectival declension (see below), particularly if they are masculine nouns ending in -y/i. This applies even to some words with no apparent adjectival connection, such as Jerzy ("George"). Certain neuter nouns, mostly place names such as Zakopane and voivodeship names such as Wielkopolskie when used alone as nouns, follow the adjectival declension but take -em rather than -ym in the instrumental and locative.

The following generalisations can be made for the inflection of all nouns:
 The nominative and vocative plural are always identical.
 For neuter nouns, the nominative, accusative and vocative are always identical in both singular and plural.
 The accusative of masculine nouns is identical to either the nominative or the genitive.
 The locative, dative and instrumental plural almost always have the same endings (-ach, -om, -ami) no matter how the noun is declined.

Masculine nouns
Masculine nouns typically end in a consonant and those inflect according to the masculine declension. Masculine nouns ending in -a (usually personal) follow the feminine declension in the singular, and the masculine declension in the plural. The same applies to male personal names in -o (as Kościuszko; also tato "dad"), although familiar first name forms like Franio follow the masculine declension throughout.

The following table shows the endings shared by all masculine nouns:

1 Some nouns ending in a palatal consonant (for example gość, koń, liść) may take the ending -mi instead of -ami; also pieniądz – pieniędzmi.

2 Except for personal nouns ending in -ec, mainly chłopiec – chłopcze ("boy"), młodzieniec – młodzieńcze ("a young person"), ojciec – ojcze ("father"), starzec – starcze ("an old person").

The rest of the cases are different for 5 different declension groups:

 declension I – all nouns ending in ć, dź, ń, ś, ź, l, j and nouns ending in p, b, m, w that gain palatalization in the oblique cases (for example karp – karpia, paw – pawia)
 dative singular ending is -owi
 locative singular ending is -u
 nominative plural is -e for non-personal nouns, and -e or -owie for personal nouns
 genitive plural is -i or -ów
 declension II – all nouns ending in c, cz, dz, dż, rz, sz, ż
 dative singular ending is -owi or -u
 locative singular ending is -u
 nominative plural is -e for non-personal nouns, and -e, -y or -owie for personal nouns
 genitive plural is -y or -ów
 declension III – all nouns ending in k, g, ch
 dative singular ending is -owi
 locative singular ending is -u
 nominative plural is -ki, -gi, -chy, respectively, for non-personal nouns, and -owie or -cy, -dzy, -si, respectively, for personal nouns
 genitive plural is -ów
 declension IV – all nouns ending in d, f, ł, n, r, s, t, z and nouns ending in p, b, m, w that do not gain palatalization in the oblique cases
 dative singular ending is -owi or -u
 locative singular ending is -e
 nominative plural is -y for non-personal nouns, and -i or -owie for personal nouns (the sequence r + i turns into rzy)
 genitive plural is -ów
 declension V – personal nouns ending in -anin
 dative singular ending is -owi
 locative singular ending is -e
 nominative plural is -anie
 genitive plural is -an or -anów

The following table compares all five declension groups:

Note also:

 Many personal nouns, especially those ending in -og (equivalent to the English -ogist), can take both forms of the nominative plural, with one form more frequent than the other for no apparent reason.
Personal nouns can become non-personal in the plural to form "depreciative forms", which convey negative attitude; for example policjanty instead of policjanci ("policemen") or ministry instead of ministrowie ("ministers"). Sometimes the ending may be the same, but the change of gender is conveyed through adjectives and pronouns agreeing with the noun, for example te wstrętne burżuje instead of ci wstrętni burżuje ("those disgusting bourgeois").

Irregularities in masculine nouns:

 The vocative singular of Bóg ("God") is Boże.
 In the plural, the stem of brat ("brother") is braci- (nominative bracia, genitive braci, instrumental braćmi).
Człowiek ("person, human") has a suppletive plural ludzie, inflected according to the first declension (the genitive is ludzi, the instrumental is ludźmi).
The declension of dech (archaic for "breath", used mainly in set phrases) is tchu, tchu/tchowi, dech, tchem, tchu, tchu.
The noun deszcz ("rain") has an archaic genitive dżdżu, used in the phrase łaknąć/pragnąć jak kania dżdżu ("to desire dearly", lit. "to desire like a kite" or "to desire like a parasol mushroom" – both names, of the bird and of the mushroom, are homonymous in Polish and there's no consensus as to which the proverb refers).
 The vocative singular of ksiądz ("priest") is księże. Its plural declension is księża, księży, księżom, księży, księżmi, księża.
 The declension of the noun książę ("prince") is książę, księcia, księciu, księcia, księciem, księciu, książę in the singular, and książęta, książąt, książętom, książeta, książętami, książętom, książętami, książęta in the plural.
 The genitive plural of przyjaciel ("friend") is przyjaciół, the dative plural is przyjaciołom, the instrumental plural is przyjaciółmi, and the locative plural is przyjaciołach.
 The nouns pan ("Mr"), syn ("son") and dom ("house") have -u in the locative and vocative singular despite belonging to the fourth declension group; pan has vocative panie.
 Rok ("year") has a suppletive neuter plural lata.
 The declension of the nouns sędzia ("judge") and hrabia ("count") is sędzia/hrabia, sędziego/hrabiego, sędziemu/hrabiemu, sędziego/hrabiego, sędzią/hrabią, sędzi/hrabi, sędzio/hrabio in the singular, and sędziowie/hrabiowie, sędziów/hrabi, sędziom/hrabiom, sędziów/hrabiów, sędziami/hrabiami, sędziach/hrabiach, sędziowie/hrabiowie.
 A few masculines have plurals in -a, usually as an alternative to the regular plural (e.g. the nominative plural of cud can be cudy or cuda).

Feminine nouns
Feminine nouns usually end in -a, although a few end in -i. These are the "a-stem" nouns. A number of feminine nouns ends in a soft or hardened consonant; these are "i-stem" nouns.

The following table shows the feminine a-stem declension:

 Feminine nouns in -i (like gospodyni "housewife") have this -i only in the nominative and vocative singular. In all other cases they decline like soft a-stem nouns.
 Soft feminine nouns that are familiar forms of personal names (like Ania, from Anna) have a vocative in -u (Aniu) or with no ending.

The following table shows the feminine i-stem declension:

 Some feminine i-stem nouns, especially those in -ość (a suffix used to form nouns from adjectives) have N/A/V/G plural in -y/i rather than -e.
 Nouns with the suffix -ość, as well as a few other nouns (such as gość "guest" and dłoń "palm") form the instrumental plural by adding just -mi rather than -ami.

Neuter nouns
Neuter nouns end in -o or -e, these are the hard and soft neuter "o-stems". A few end in -ę, the so-called "n-stem" and "t-stem" nouns.

The following table shows the neuter o-stem declension:

 Some neuter nouns take -y/i in the genitive plural, particularly those ending in -e that have a prefix (e.g. narzędzie "tool", G pl. narzędzi).
 Some neuter nouns that were borrowed from Latin end in -um. These are indeclinable in the singular (always -um) but follow the hard or soft neuter declension in the plural.

The neuter n-stem and neuter t-stem nouns decline as soft neuter o-stems in the singular but as hard neuter o-stems in the plural. In addition, they have shortened nominative/accusative/vocative singular forms ending in -ę.

Irregular nouns
Notable irregular forms include the following:

dziecko ("child") has plural N/A/V/G dzieci (I dziećmi; D dzieciom etc.).
ręka ("arm, hand") has N/A/V plural ręce (also alternative L singular ręku and I plural rękoma); oko ("eye") and ucho ("ear") have plural oczy/uszy etc. (G oczu/uszu). These derive from old dual forms.
pani ("lady, Mrs") has accusative singular panią.

Invariant nouns
The following types of nouns are generally invariant, and do not inflect at all:
 Names of letters
 Some foreign-derived words that do not fit any standard pattern
 Most foreign place names (except well-known ones that fit a standard pattern)
 Personal names of females that don't end in -a
 Normally masculine nouns used as feminines to refer to women (often preceded by pani, which is declined, as in pani profesor)
 Titles of works etc. that do not have the form of nouns/adjectives
 Nouns that are already inflected (e.g. Chrobrego, a genitive, which can be used unchanged in all cases as short for a street name such as ulica Chrobrego)
 Names preceded by a specifying noun (for example wieś Dębowo, "the village of Dębowo", where only wieś is declined
 Names of gminas such as gmina Czersk)

Foreign personal names of males are declined if at all possible; some special rules are applied depending on the original language. Those that end "-y" or "-i" generally follow the adjectival declension, but these are treated as -i, i.e. the previous consonant is soft, and this is shown in inflected written forms such as Tony'ego.

Adjectives

Adjectives agree with the noun they modify in terms of gender and number. They are declined according to the following pattern ( means "proud"):

The following principles apply:
The longer ending  is used in certain adjectives, especially those in consonant+, for pronounceability:  ("pretty–prettier").
Irregular comparatives include  (from  "good"),  (from  "bad"),  (from  "big"),  (from  "small"),  (from  "narrow"),  (from  "long").

Adverbs are formed from adjectives with the ending , or in some cases . Comparatives of adverbs are formed (where they exist) with the ending . Superlatives have the prefix  as for adjectives. Irregular comparatives include  ("better"),  ("worse"),  ("more", also  when not concerned with quantity, from  "very"),  ("less").

Pronouns
This section gives the declensions of Polish pronouns. For information on meanings and usage, see Pronouns in the article on Polish grammar.

Personal pronouns 
1st person singular N ja, G/A/L mnie, D mnie (clitic mi), I mną
2nd person singular familiar N ty, G/A ciebie (clitic cię), D tobie (clitic ci), I tobą, L tobie
3rd person singular masculine N on, G/A jego/niego (clitic go), D jemu/niemu (clitic mu), I/L nim
3rd person singular feminine N ona, G/D jej/niej, A ją/nią, I nią, L niej
3rd person singular neuter N ono, A je/nie, other cases as masculine
1st person plural N my, G/A/L nas, D nam, I nami
2nd person plural familiar N wy, G/A/L was, D wam, I wami
3rd person plural masculine personal N oni, G/A ich/nich, D im/nim, I nimi, L nich
3rd person plural other N one, A je/nie, other cases as for masculine personal

Polite 2nd person forms: pan (plural panowie) and pani (plural panie) are declined like those nouns. The mixed-sex form państwo (which can also be used as a noun to refer to a mixed-sex group or couple) is masculine personal plural, but declines like the neuter noun państwo ("state, country") except that the accusative is państwa (like the genitive) and the locative państwu.

Reflexive pronouns 
The declension of się is shown below. The form "siebie" is used when the pronouns is disconnected from the verb.

Possessive pronouns 
Possessive pronouns such as mój, twój, nasz, wasz are declined like adjectives (moja, moje etc.), as are swój and pański. The third-person forms jego, jej and ich are invariant, as are other forms identical to genitives (pana etc.)

Demonstrative pronouns 
The demonstrative pronouns ten (this) and tamten (that) are declined in a manner similar to adjectives. Their declensions are shown below. 

* Tego/Tamtego are used for the Masculine Animate declension and Ten/Tamten are used for the Masculine inanimate declension.

** tą is only used in informal speech, tę is the standard written form.

Interrogative pronouns 
The declensions of "kto" and "co" are shown below. 

Derived pronouns such as ktoś/coś, ktokolwiek/cokolwiek, and nikt/nic are declined similarly to kto and co, however nic has the unaltered (accusative) form instead of niczego when it is the object of a negated verb.

Numbers and quantifiers
The declension of numerals is given below (accusative and vocative are equal to nominative unless stated). For information on formation and usage, see Numbers and quantifiers in the article on Polish grammar.
1 jeden like an adjective (feminine jedna etc., but neuter N/A jedno). The plural forms also exist (jedni/jedne etc.); they are used to mean "some", or to mean "one" with pluralia tantum (jedne drzwi "one door").
2 dwa (feminine N/A dwie, masc. personal N dwaj/dwóch A dwu/dwóch), G/L dwóch, D dwóm, I dwoma (fem. also dwiema)
3 trzy (masc. personal N trzej/trzech A trzech), G/L trzech, D trzem, I trzema
4 cztery (masc. personal N czterej/czterech A czterech), G/L czterech, D czterem, I czterema
5 pięć (masc. personal N/A pięciu), G/D/L pięciu, I pięcioma
The same pattern as 5 is followed for the higher numbers sześć, siedem (siedmiu etc.), osiem (ośmiu etc.), dziewięć, dziesięć; jedenaście (jedenastu) etc.; dwadzieścia (dwudziestu etc.), trzydzieści (trzydziestu), czterdzieści (-stu), pięćdziesiąt (pięćdziesięciu) etc.; sto (stu etc.), dwieście (dwustu etc.), trzysta (trzystu etc.), czterysta (-stu); pięćset (pięciuset) etc. From 500 onwards (and optionally for the lower hundreds) the instrumental is the same as the G/D/L form.

Higher numbers (tysiąc, milion etc.) are declined as nouns, and their multiples are treated as number+noun combinations (dwa tysiące "two thousand" behaves like dwa miesiące "two months", and so on).

In compound numbers only the last part of the number is inflected, except when there are both tens and units, in which case both of those are inflected, and when jeden, which is indeclinable in all compound numbers, is the last part of the number, in which case the second to last part is inflected.

Collective numerals:
, G , D/L , I 
, G , D/L , I 
, G , D/L , I . Similarly for  etc.

Quantifiers:
, G/D/L and masc. personal N/A , I .
 are invariant (so not often used in oblique cases if the meaning would be unclear)
forms like  behave like 15, 50, 500
oba ("both") behaves like dwa (including feminine obie, masculine personal obaj/obu, collective oboje, etc.), but usually with obu where dwa has dwóch. The other word for "both", obydwa, inflects like dwa.

Verbs 

The lemma of a verb is the infinitive, which usually ends in -ć (occasionally -c). Examples for infinitives in Polish include "być", "czytać", and "brać".

If a verb includes a prefix, then it is generally conjugated like the unprefixed verb, although sometimes the prefix may change its form (e.g. +: infinitive , but present tense  etc.)

The present tense (or future tense of perfective verbs) may follow either of the following patterns:
Pattern 1: -m (1st person singular), -sz (2nd singular), - (3rd singular); -my (1st plural), -cie (2nd plural), -ją (3rd plural). This is followed by many verbs in -ać, such as śpiewać ("sing"): śpiewam, śpiewasz, śpiewa etc. It is also followed by mieć ("have"): mam etc.; umieć ("know how to"; similarly rozumieć "understand"): umiem etc.; jeść ("eat", similarly with prefixes): jem etc., but 3P jedzą; wiedzieć ("know", similarly with prefixes e.g. powiedzieć "say"): wiem etc. but wiedzą; and dać ("give", similarly with prefixes): dam etc. but dadzą.

Pattern 2: -ę (1st singular); -ą (3rd plural); other forms with the same endings as above, but possibly with a different form of the stem than for 1S and 3P. For example:
brać ("take"): 
kupić ("buy"): 

The future tense of być ("be") also follows the above pattern: będę, będziesz, będzie, ..., będą However the present tense of być is irregular:
jestem, jesteś, jest; jesteśmy, jesteście, są

The past tense of most verbs is formed by replacing the -ć of the infinitive with -ł for the masculine singular, -ła for feminine singular, -ło for neuter singular, -ły for feminine plural and -li for other plurals; then adding the endings  for 1S, 2S, 3S, 1P, 2P, 3P. (The -e- in the singular suffixes appears after a consonant but not after a vowel.) For example, from być:
 1S byłem/byłam, 2S byłeś/byłaś, 3S był/była/było, 1P byliśmy/byłyśmy, 2P byliście/byłyście, 3P byli/były.

The personal past tense suffixes, which are reduced forms of the present tense of być, are clitics and can be detached from the verb to attach to another accented word earlier in the sentence. 

Some verbs form their past stems differently:
Verbs in -eć have past tense in -ał(-) (the a alternates with e, so the masculine personal plural is -eli(-)).
Verbs in -ąć have an alternating vowel (ę in place of ą when the following ł is followed by a vowel), although the alternation does not apply before -em and -eś (zacząć "begin": zacząłem/zaczęłam etc.) The explanation for this is that ą shifts to ę only if it is the penultimate syllable of the verb, and in the original uncliticized verb zaczął, ą was part of the final syllable rather than the penultimate like in zaczęła.

Verbs in -c have a past stem ending with a consonant, related to the (1S/3P) present stem, e.g. móc "be able": 1S present mogę, past stem móg- (with alternating vowel, this time even before -em and -eś:, mogłem/mogłam,... , mógł/mogła/mogło etc.)

Some other verbs also follow the above pattern, i.e. with a stem ending in a consonant. (Note that the ł is not pronounced when final and preceded by a consonant.) This includes most verbs in -ść and -źć, e.g. nieść ("carry"): niosłem...niósł...nieśli. The verb iść ("go") has the irregular past stem forms szedł/szła/szło, szli/szły (similarly for its compounds: pójść has poszedł/poszła etc.). znaleźć and related verbs have forms like znalazł, znaleźli.
Some verbs in -nąć drop that ending in some or all of their past stems, sometimes optionally. For example, zniknąć ("disappear") has znikł(a) as alternatives to zniknął/zniknęła.

The conditional (or subjunctive) is formed from the past tense plus by, the personal endings (if any) coming after the by. For example: byłbym/byłabym, byłbyś/byłabyś, byłby/byłaby/byłoby; bylibyśmy/byłybyśmy, bylibyście/byłybyście, byliby/byłyby. The endings (-by, -bym etc.) are detachable clitics, like the past tense personal endings as mentioned above.

The future tense of imperfective verbs (other than być) is formed using the future of być (będę etc.) together with the infinitive, or the past form (inflected for gender and number, but without any personal suffixes), of the verb in question. For example, the future of robić ("do, make") has such forms as będę robić/robił/robiła, będzicie robić/robili/robiły. The choice between infinitive and past form is usually a free one, but with modals governing another infinitive, the past form is used: będzie musiał odejść (not będzie musieć...) "he will have to leave".

The second personal singular imperative is formed from the present tense by dropping the ending (e.g. brać: 2/3S present , imperative ), adding -ij for pronounceability (e.g. , pres. , imperative ); or (if the present tense is in -a-) by adding -aj (e.g. , pres. , imperative ). Irregular examples include być: bądź, mieć: miej. Add -my and -cie for the 1P and 2P forms. To make third-person imperative sentences (including with the polite second-person pronouns pan etc.) the particle niech is used.

Other forms of the verb are:
present adverbial participle (imperfective verbs only), formed from the 3P present tense by adding -c (e.g. śpiewać: śpiewając; być has będąc)
present adjectival participle (imperfective verbs only), formed from the present adverbial participle by adding adjectival endings (e.g. śpiewać: śpiewający etc.)
past active participle (perfective verbs only), formed from the past tense by replacing -ł with -wszy (or -łszy after a consonant), e.g. zabić: zabiwszy "having killed" (this form is invariant, i.e. it is an adverbial participle).
passive participle (all transitive verbs), in -ny or -ty (conjugated as an adjective). The form used depends on the ending of the infinitive: -ać: -any; -eć: -any but with vowel alternation (i.e. masc. personal pl. -eni); -yć/-ić: -ony/-iony but with vowel alternation (-eni), or -yty/-ity in verbs with present tense in -yje/-ije, like myć "wash" and bić "beat"; -ąć: -ęty (but -nąć: -nięty). Verbs with past stem ending in a consonant form the participle from the (3S) present tense form, e.g. nieść "carry", pres. niosę,... niesie, past niósł, passive participle niesiony. Note also jeść: jedzony.
subjectless past tense, formed as the past participle but with the ending -o (e.g. śpiewano "it was sung")
verbal noun, also called the gerund, formed from the past participle with the ending -ie, e.g. śpiewanie (note vowel alternation, e.g. rozumieć: rozumiany: rozumienie). This is a neuter noun.

The modal verb powinien ("should") is conjugated in the present tense with adjective-type and personal endings, similar to the past tense of regular verbs(powinna/-o/-i/-y; powinienem/powinnam "I should" etc.) It has only one tense, although on rare occasions, past tense forms of "być" (byłem, byłeś, był, etc.) are added to show past meaning.

Prepositions and prefixes
Before some consonant clusters, particularly clusters beginning with a sibilant (in the case of z) or with f/w (in the case of w), the prepositions z and w take the form ze and we, respectively; (e.g. we Wrocławiu "in Wrocław"). These forms are also used before the first-person singular pronouns in mn-; several other prepositions also have longer forms before these pronouns (przeze mnie, pode mną etc.), and these phrases are pronounced as single words, with the stress on the penultimate syllable (the -e).

When z is used as a prefix, it is spelt "s" if it is part of a voiceless consonant cluster. As preposition it is spelt z, even if it is pronounced /s/. The epenthesis of -e- also applies to the prefixes w-, z-/s-, and to all -w or -z/-s (roz- + znać = rozeznać).

Word formation
Polish makes wide use of prefixes and suffixes in word formation. Some examples of this are:
Addition of prefixes to make perfective forms of verbs or to modify the meaning. The prefixes used for this purpose are mostly identical to prepositions (although they also include roz-, and prze-, the latter corresponding to the preposition przez). The same prefixes are used for word formation with other parts of speech also.
Formation of verbs from nouns using the suffix -ować (as in kolorować "to colour" from kolor "colour"; organizować "to organize", cf. organizacja "organization").
Formation of adjectives from nouns using suffixes such as -owy, -ny, -ski and -i (as in koci "cat's" from kot "cat").
Formation of nouns from adjectives, usually using the suffix -ość (to form feminine nouns).
Formation of nouns from verbs, usually in -nie, sometimes -cie (see the section on Verbs above).
Formation of nouns from other nouns or other stems, using such suffixes as -nik, -nica, -ec, etc. (with various meanings).
Formation of diminutive forms of nouns, usually using the suffixes -ek/-ka/-ko (for the respective genders).

References

Further reading

External links
 Polish Pronunciation Audio and Grammar Charts
 ‘Polszczyzna’ & the Revolutionary Feminine Suffix 

Morphology